There is significant phonological variation among the various Yiddish dialects. The description that follows is of a modern Standard Yiddish that was devised during the early 20th century and is frequently encountered in pedagogical contexts.

Consonants

  are bilabial, whereas  are labiodental.
 The  contrast has collapsed in some speakers.
 The palatalized coronals  appear only in Slavic loanwords. The phonemic status of these palatalised consonants, as well as any other affricates, is unclear.
  is an allophone of  after , and it can only be syllabic .
  is an allophone of  before .
It is thus safe to assume that  is phonetically uvular .
This can mean that it is either palatalized alveolar  or alveolo-palatal .  may actually also be alveolo-palatal , rather than just palatal.
 The rhotic  can be either alveolar or uvular, either a trill  or, more commonly, a flap/tap .
 The glottal stop  appears only as an intervocalic separator.

As in the Slavic languages with which Yiddish was long in contact (Russian, Belarusian, Polish, and Ukrainian), but unlike German, voiceless stops have little to no aspiration; unlike many such languages, voiced stops are not devoiced in final position.

Vowels
The vowel phonemes of Standard Yiddish are:

  are typically near-close  respectively, but the height of  may vary freely between a higher and lower allophone.
  appears only in unstressed syllables.

In addition, the sonorants  and  can function as syllable nuclei:
אײזל   'donkey'
אָװנט   'evening'

The syllabic sonorants are always unstressed.

Dialectal variation 
Stressed vowels in the Yiddish dialects may be understood by considering their common origins in the Proto-Yiddish sound system. Yiddish linguistic scholarship uses a system developed by Max Weinreich in 1960 to indicate the descendent diaphonemes of the Proto-Yiddish stressed vowels. 

Each Proto-Yiddish vowel is given a unique two-digit identifier, and its reflexes use it as a subscript, for example Southeastern o11 is the vowel /o/, descended from Proto-Yiddish */a/. The first digit indicates Proto-Yiddish quality (1-=*[a], 2-=*[e], 3-=*[i], 4-=*[o], 5-=*[u]), and the second refers to quantity or diphthongization (−1=short, −2=long, −3=short but lengthened early in the history of Yiddish, −4=diphthong, −5=special length occurring only in Proto-Yiddish vowel 25). 

Vowels 23, 33, 43 and 53 have the same reflexes as 22, 32, 42 and 52 in all Yiddish dialects, but they developed distinct values in Middle High German; Katz (1987) argues that they should be collapsed with the −2 series, leaving only 13 in the −3 series.

Comparison with German

In vocabulary of Germanic origin, the differences between Standard German and Yiddish pronunciation are mainly in the vowels and diphthongs.

Diphthongs have also undergone divergent developments in German and Yiddish. Lastly, the Standard German  corresponds to both the MHG diphthong ou and the long vowel û, but in Yiddish, they have not merged.

The vowel length distinctions of German do not exist in the Northeastern (Lithuanian) varieties of Yiddish, which form the phonetic basis for Standard Yiddish. In those varieties, the vowel qualities in most long/short vowel pairs diverged and so the phonemic distinction has remained.

Yiddish has some coincidental resemblances to Dutch in vowel phonology, which extend even to orthography, such as Dutch ij versus Yiddish tsvey judn, both pronounced /ɛɪ/; and Dutch ui (pronounced /œy/) versus Yiddish vov yud (/ɔj/). For example, the Yiddish "to be" is זיין, which orthographically matches Dutch zijn more than German sein, or Yiddish הויז, "house", versus Dutch huis (plural huizen). Along with the pronunciation of Dutch g as /ɣ/, Yiddish is said to sound closer to Dutch than to German because of that even though its structure is closer to High German.

There are consonantal differences between German and Yiddish. Additionally, final voiced stops appear in Standard Yiddish but not Northern Standard German.

Comparison with Hebrew
The pronunciation of vowels in Yiddish words of Hebrew origin is similar to Ashkenazi Hebrew but not identical. The most prominent difference is kamatz gadol in closed syllables being pronounced same as patah in Yiddish but the same as any other kamatz in Ashkenazi Hebrew. Also, Hebrew features no reduction of unstressed vowels and so the given name Jochebed  would be  in Ashkenazi Hebrew but  in Standard Yiddish.

Patah in open syllable, as well as hataf patah, are unpredictably split between A1 and A2:  ;  .

References

Bibliography

 Birnbaum, Solomon A., Yiddish: A Survey and a Grammar, University of Toronto Press, Toronto, 1979, .
 Herzog, Marvin, et al. ed., YIVO, The Language and Culture Atlas of Ashkenazic Jewry, 3 vols., Max Niemeyer Verlag, Tübingen, 1992–2000, .

Further reading

External links
 Jewish Language Research Website

Phonology
Germanic phonologies